Greatest Hits: 1985–1993 is a compilation album by American recording R&B singer Stephanie Mills released in 1996. This is Mills fourth hits compilation and includes most of her hit singles released from her catalog on MCA Records. The album features "Bit by Bit" theme song from Fletch and "Where Is the Love" a duet with singer Robert Brookins, a song was originally recorded by Donny Hathaway and Roberta Flack.

The hits album also includes Mills' biggest R&B charting singles: "Home", "I Feel Good All Over", "Something in the Way (You Make Me Feel)", "(You're Puttin') A Rush on Me" and "I Have Learned to Respect the Power of Love". All five singles reached number one on the Billboard R&B singles chart.

Track listing

References

External links
Stephanie Mills Discography
"Stephanie Mills Greatest Hits" Album at Discogs

1996 greatest hits albums
Stephanie Mills compilation albums
MCA Records compilation albums
Pop compilation albums